Campylomyza is a genus of midges in the family Cecidomyiidae. The 40 described species are found in the Holarctic, Oriental, Neotropical, and Australasian regions. The genus was first described by German entomologist Johann Wilhelm Meigen in 1818.

Species
Campylomyza abbreviata Jaschhof, 2009
Campylomyza abjecta Mamaev, 1998
Campylomyza aborigena Mamaev, 1998
Campylomyza aemula Mamaev, 1998
Campylomyza alnea Jaschhof, 2009
Campylomyza alpina Siebke, 1863
Campylomyza angulata Jaschhof, 2015
Campylomyza appendiculata Jaschhof, 2015
Campylomyza arcuata Jaschhof, 2009
Campylomyza armata Mamaev, 1963
Campylomyza bicolor Meigen, 1818
Campylomyza borealis MJaschhof, 2009
Campylomyza cavitata Mamaev, 1998
Campylomyza cingulata Jaschhof, 2009
Campylomyza cornuta Jaschhof, 1998
Campylomyza cornoidea Jaschhof, 1998
†Campylomyza crassitarsis Meunier, 1904
Campylomyza cruciata Mamaev, 1998
Campylomyza dilatata Felt, 1907
Campylomyza falcifera Jaschhof, 2009
Campylomyza flavipes Meigen, 1818
Campylomyza furva Edwards, 1938
Campylomyza fusca Winnertz, 1870
Campylomyza hybrida Jaschhof, 2009
Campylomyza inornata Jaschhof, 2009
Campylomyza insolita Jaschhof, 2009
Campylomyza lapponica Jaschhof, 2015
Campylomyza mohrigi Jaschhof, 2009
†Campylomyza monilifera Loew, 1850
Campylomyza nigroliminata Mamaev, 1998
Campylomyza ormerodi (Kieffer, 1913)
Campylomyza paenebicolor Jaschhof, 2009
Campylomyza pubescens Jaschhof, 2009
Campylomyza serrata Jaschhof, 1998
Campylomyza spatulata Mamaev, 1998
Campylomyza spinata Jaschhof, 1998
Campylomyza stegetfore Jaschhof, 2009
Campylomyza tridentata Jaschhof, 1998
Campylomyza zwii Jaschhof, 2015

References

Cecidomyiidae genera

Insects described in 1818
Taxa named by Johann Wilhelm Meigen